Hell Gap complex is a Plano culture from 10,060 to 9,600 before present.  It is named after the Hell Gap archaeological site, in Goshen County, Wyoming.

Other Hell Gap complex sites
In addition to the Hell Gap archaeological site, other Wyoming archaeological sites include the Sister's Hill site in northeastern Wyoming and a bison kill site near Casper, Wyoming. Jones-Miller Bison Kill Site is the only Hell Gap complex site in Colorado.

Hell Gap point
The Hell Gap projectile points are long stemmed, convex blades.

See also
Goshen point — of the nearby Goshen complex.

References
Notes

Citations

Archaeology of the United States
Archaeological cultures of North America
Hunter-gatherers of the United States
Archaeological sites in Wyoming
Native American history of Wyoming
Paleo-Indian period
Paleo-Indian archaeological sites in Colorado
Pre-Columbian cultures
Prehistoric cultures in Colorado
Goshen County, Wyoming